William Ross Short (November 27, 1937 – February 2, 2022) was an American professional baseball pitcher. During his 15-year pro career, he played all or parts of six seasons in Major League Baseball between 1960 and 1969.

A ,  left-hander, Short was originally signed by the New York Yankees in 1955. He made his major league debut for the Yankees in 1960 and played his final game with the Cincinnati Reds in 1969. In between, he appeared for the Baltimore Orioles, Boston Red Sox, Pittsburgh Pirates and New York Mets.

On July 1, 1966 against the Minnesota Twins, Short threw the only shutout of his MLB career, a six-hitter. In 73 career big-league games pitched, including 16 starts, he posted a 5–11 record and 4.73 earned run average, allowing 130 hits and 64 bases on balls in 131 innings pitched. He had three complete games, two saves, and 64 strikeouts.

In 1959, Short was selected the Most Valuable Pitcher in the Triple-A International League after compiling a 17–6 (2.48) mark for the Richmond Virginians. He would win 13 or more games three more times during his long career in that Triple-A league, and in 2009 he was inducted into the International League Hall of Fame.

Short died on February 2, 2022.

References

External links
, or Venezuelan Professional Baseball League

1937 births
2022 deaths
Baltimore Orioles players
Baseball players from New York (state)
Binghamton Triplets players
Boston Red Sox players
Bristol Twins players
Cincinnati Reds players
Columbus Jets players
Indianapolis Indians players
Major League Baseball pitchers
Monroe Sports players
New York Mets players
New York Yankees players
Sportspeople from Kingston, New York
Peoria Chiefs players
Pittsburgh Pirates players
Richmond Virginians (minor league) players
Rochester Red Wings players
Tigres de Aragua players
American expatriate baseball players in Venezuela
Newburgh Free Academy alumni